Luis Rodríguez (born 9 October 1947) is a Venezuelan boxer. He competed in the men's lightweight event at the 1972 Summer Olympics.

References

1947 births
Living people
Venezuelan male boxers
Olympic boxers of Venezuela
Boxers at the 1972 Summer Olympics
Place of birth missing (living people)
Lightweight boxers